Ömer Faruk Beyaz (born 29 August 2003) is a Turkish professional footballer who plays as an attacking midfielder for German  club VfB Stuttgart.

Club career
On 31 August 2018, Beyaz signed a professional contract with Fenerbahçe. He made his professional debut with Fenerbahçe in a 3–1 Turkish Cup loss to Trabzonspor on 16 June 2020, at the age of 16.

On 14 April 2021, Beyaz signed a professional contract with VfB Stuttgart. On 27 July 2022, he was loaned to Magdeburg. The loan was terminated early on 2 January 2023.

References

External links

 
 
 

2003 births
Living people
People from Bağcılar
Footballers from Istanbul
Turkish footballers
Association football midfielders
Turkey under-21 international footballers
Turkey youth international footballers
Fenerbahçe S.K. footballers
VfB Stuttgart players
1. FC Magdeburg players
Süper Lig players
Bundesliga players
2. Bundesliga players
Turkish expatriate footballers
Turkish expatriate sportspeople in Germany
Expatriate footballers in Germany